Holly Bowling (born May 11, 1984) is an American pianist. She is best known as a former member of the band Ghost Light in which she performed on keys and vocals. Classically-trained, she has transcribed some of the music of Phish and the Grateful Dead into arrangements for solo piano. In 2014, Bowling published her "Jam Transcription" of Phish's famous rendition of "Tweezer" from Lake Tahoe on July 31, 2013. The success of Bowling's "Tahoe Tweezer" ignited her career as a musician.

Her first solo tour began in July 2015. She has released two albums inspired by the music of Phish and the Grateful Dead and is now a well respected and established musician in the psychedelic rock and jamband music scene. Bowling is a frequent guest member of Everyone Orchestra, Phil Lesh & Friends, as well as being a part of Warren Haynes' Christmas Jam for the last two consecutive years. She has performed at Carnegie Hall, Blue Note Jazz Club, The Massey Center, Lockn' Music Festival, Jam Cruise & The Peach Festival. She was named by Rolling Stone in November 2016 as one of "Ten New Artists You Need To Know Right Now."

Early life
Bowling began playing piano at age 5 under the Suzuki Methodology. In 1999, Bowling won the Norbert Mueller Concerto Competition for her performance of Vivace a Concerto for Piano in D Major. by  J. Haydn. Bowling earned a Bachelor of Music in Piano Performance from San Francisco State University. While there, Bowling studied under William Corbett Jones. She won both the Ross McKee award and the 2007 Michael Avalos award, the two most coveted prizes in the SFSU Piano Department. Bowling transitioned from her job as a Suzuki Piano instructor for kids into fully dedicating herself to playing live shows in 2015. As of 2017, she has attended over 300 Phish shows during the 2.0 and 3.0 era. She currently resides in San Francisco, California with her husband, Jeffery Bowling, and their son.

Career
Bowling's first live performance was in a San Francisco bar during Phish's 2014 Bill Graham Civic Center run. The Tahoe Tweezer (Phish 7/31/13) published on October
28, 2014, has received over 95k views on YouTube. On August 10, 2015, Bowling released her first album "Distillation of a Dream: The Music of Phish Reimagined for Solo Piano," a 14 song, 2 LP set. The 1st LP is recreations of Phish studio performances and the 2nd LP is composed of live Phish Jam Transcriptions.  The "Distillation of a Dream" project took 9 months of development. Peter Smolin, of Hornblower Records, helped Bowling launch a Pledge Music campaign to raise $12,000 for funds to cover recording costs, marketing, and royalties which successfully raised $16,500. A portion of album sales went to The Mockingbird Foundation.

There are two approaches Bowling utilizes to adapt a full band's arrangement into a solo composition for the piano. “Jam Teases” are created by transcribing a small section of a song’s jam made famous by Phish or the Grateful Dead. More than 40 songs have now been transcribed as "Jam-Teases." One example is the "Beautiful Jam," played by the Grateful Dead within a “Dark Star” > “Wharf Rat” > “Dark Star” sequence at The Capitol Theatre in Port Chester, New York on 2/18/71. In a “Jam Transcription,” Bowling takes the full live version of a song and transcribes it note for note. To date, she has created four “Jam Transcriptions”: Phish’s "A Song I Heard The Ocean Sing," from SPAC in Saratoga Springs, NY on 6/19/04, "The Wedge," from Northerly Island in Chicago on 7/20/14, "Twist," from Glens Falls Civic Center in Glens Falls, NY on 10/23/13; and the Grateful Dead’s "Eyes of the World," from Freedom Hall in Louisville, KY on 6/18/74.

In 2015, Jambase included Bowling in their "Songs of Their Own" video series featuring her rendition of "Eyes of the World," from Freedom Hall on 6/18/74. In 2016, Bowling released her second album, Better Left Unsung, which is a collection of classical solo piano arrangements of the Grateful Dead. The album release party for Better Left Unsung was held on December 7, 2016, at Phil Lesh’s Terrapin Crossroads. The album was released on December 9, 2016. The night of the album release, Bowling performed with Bob Weir at the Orange Peel in Asheville, North Carolina. Better Left Unsung reached its peak position on the Billboard Classical Albums charts at #25.

On January 22, 2017, during her solo tour, Bowling performed an original composition, "Evolution," for the first time. Bowling has performed four original compositions on solo tours entitled: "Proxima B," "You Are Not Are You," "Rocket’s Theme," and "Evolution."

In 2018, Bowling's focus shifted from her solo touring career to the formation of a band. The new five-piece band, Ghost Light, began touring in the spring releasing their first album "Best Kept Secrets" on 3/22/2019

Ghost Light
In early 2018, Bowling, guitarist Tom Hamilton (American Babies/Joe Russo’s Almost Dead), guitarist Raina Mullen (American Babies), bassist Steve Lyons (Nicos Gun), and drummer Scotty Zwang (Dopapod/RAQ) announced they were forming Ghost Light. This improvisational rock jamband is based in Philadelphia, Pennsylvania, the hometown of Hamilton, Mullen, Lyons and Zwang.

Ghost Light began with laying down its foundation in the studio, often working in five-day blocks to develop its improvisational, collaborative material prior to taking it out on the road for a live audience. They originally assembled for a session at a recording studio in Hamilton, Mullen, Lyons and Zwang’s hometown of Philadelphia. Ghost Light’s aim was to “come to the project with fresh ears and no pre-conceived notions.” The quintet developed songs and a musical communication, which then led to a bond and trust between the musicians.

Ghost Light's inaugural tour commenced with a sold out show on March 20, 2018, at Winstons in San Diego, CA. The first half of 2018, will see the band playing well known venues in major markets coast to coast, followed by heavy rotation on the festival circuit including the Peach Music Festival, Lockn’ Festival, Beanstalk Music Festival, Disc Jam, High Sierra Music Festival, and The Werk Out with more to be announced. During the west coast leg of the tour, the band debuted playing an acoustic set as well as special guest, Grahame Lesh, joining them for a song on both nights at Terrapin Crossroads. Along with band originals, the live shows have also featured songs of Grateful Dead, Rolling Stones, Led Zeppelin, Bob Dylan, Radiohead, Van Halen, Derek & the Dominos, Tears for Fears, Bruce Cockburn, and Father John Misty. The debut record will be released in the second half of the year and will be supported by an extensive tour.

On December 6th, 2022, Holly announced that she would be leaving Ghost Light at the end of the year. Her last show with Ghost Light was December 29th, 2022 in Denver, CO.

Equipment
Yamaha CP4, Nord Electro 4 & 5

First introductions and early shows

2013
The Chapel with Marco Benevento a benefit for Bread & Roses (special invite with donation up on stage by Marco Benevento) 12/1/13 
Marco Benevento at The Highline Ballroom post Phish MSG show 12/30/13

2014
Distillation of a Dream: Tahoe Tweezer in 88 Keys - 10/27/14 - Noir Lounge in San Francisco, CA.  This is Bowling's first ever public performance of her solo piano interpretations of the music of Phish.  This also marks the day the full version of her solo piano version of the Tahoe Tweezer is released on YouTube.

2015
Magnaball Festival in 2015 - 2 clandestine solo sets from the lot night one & at the Wetlands campground night two 
Phan art Presents: A World Cafe Live One 8/25/15

Collaborations and special guest appearances

2016
Greensky Bluegrass at McDonald Theatre in Eugene, Oregon 3/26/16 
Terrapin Crossroads playing with Phil Lesh for the 1st time, along with Ross “MF” James, & Eric Diberardino. 11/4/16 
Bob Weir & Friends  at the Orange Peel in Asheville, NC 12/9/16 
Warren Haynes' Christmas Jam at US Cellular Center in Asheville, North Carolina 12/10/16

2017
Phil Lesh & Friends at TXR Bar in San Rafael, CA 1/12/17 
Umphree’s McGee at 20 Monroe Live in Grand Rapids, MI 2/2/17 
Everyone Orchestra at Pour House in Charleston, SC 3/9/17 & 3/10/17 
Everyone Orchestra at The Ardmore Music Hall in Ardmore, PA 4/29/17 
Songs To Phil the Air at The Back porch stage in San Rafael, CA 6/7/17 
Holly Bowling with Tom Hamilton's American Babies from the Ardmore Music Hall in Ardmore, PA 7/14/17 
Everyone Orchestra at Higher Ground in Burlington, VT 7/28/17 
Live Dead '69 at The Hamilton in Washington DC 8/1/17 
Scott Law & Ross James' Cosmic Twang at Terrapin Crossroads in San Rafael, CA 8/19/17 
Phil Lesh & Friends ft. Bob Weir at Mount Tamalpais State Park 9/9/17 
Phil & Stu do Europe '72 Vol 1 & 2 from Terrapin Crossroads in San Rafael, CA 9/14/17 & 9/15/17 
Songs To Phil the Air at The Back porch stage in San Rafael, CA 9/19/17 
Phriendsgiving at Terrapin Crossroads in San Rafael, CA 11/12/17 
The Jazz is Phish at the Mezzanine in San Francisco, CA 11/17/17 
Everyone Orchestra in The Great Room at Terrapin Crossroads in San Rafael, CA 12/1/17 & 12/2/17 
Warren Haynes' Christmas Jam U.S. Cellular Center in Asheville, NC 12/9/17 
Everyone Orchestra at Gypsy Sally's in Washington, D.C. 12/29/17 
Everyone Orchestra at The Gramercy Theater New York, NY 12/30/17

2018
Phil & Terrapin Family Band at the 1st TXR House Party 1/15/18 
Jam Cruise 16 - Everyone Orchestra, Andy Frasco, Robert Randolph Super Jam, Jen Hartswick Jam Room Set, Dan Lebowitz Jam Room Set 1/17/18 - 1/22/18  
Cosmic Twang at the Chapel in San Francisco, CA 3/2/18 
Thunder & Lightning in the Grate Room from Terrapin Crossroads in San Rafael, CA 4/24/18

2019
phAb6 at Cervantes Masterpiece Ballroom in Denver, CO with Paul Hoffman, Anders Beck, Jay Cobb Anderson, Andrew Altman, & Tyler Thompson 02/21/19 
Phil & Friends at Peach Music Festival with Phil Lesh, John Scofield, Warren Haynes & John Molo 07/18/19

Played with
Phil Lesh, Bob Weir, Page McConnell, Warren Haynes, John Scofield, Ivan Neville, Steve Kimock, Oteil Burbridge, Dave Schools,  Branford Marsalis, Marco Benevento, Claude Coleman Jr., Duane Trucks, Natalie Cressman, Jennifer Hartswick, Jim James, Greensky Bluegrass, Umphrey's McGee, Railroad Earth, Tom Hamilton's American Babies, Don Was, Robert Randolph, Jason Hahn, Tony Hall, Alvin Ford Jr., Ross James, Stu Allen, Dan Lebowitz, Grahame Lesh, Jay Lane, Scott Law

Discography
2015-08-10 Distillation of a Dream: The Music of Phish Reimagined for Solo Piano 
2016-12-09 Better Left Unsung: The Music of the Grateful Dead Reimagined for Solo Piano
2019-08-23 Live at the Old Church: Solo piano recorded 9/21/2018 at the Old Church Concert Hall in Portland, OR

 2020-11-20 Seeking All That's Still Unsung: Solo piano renditions of the music of the Grateful Dead

Videography
Holly Bowling: Distilling a Dream (April 14, 2016) produced by Conveniently Texan Pictures of her first east coast performance on August 10 at Philly's Howl at the Moon. 
Songs of Their Own created by Jambase in 2015 ft. Holly Bowling playing  Eyes of the World from Freedom Hall in Louisville, KY on 6/8/74

Selected performances and shows
'Beautiful Jam' at Terrapin Crossroads in San Rafael, CA 12/7/16 
Old Church Concert Hall in Portland, OR 1/20/17 Set 2  
James Street Speakeasy in Pittsburgh, PA 3/14/17 
Tahoe Tweezer at The Cutting Room in NY 7/22/17 
Gamehendge Suite at The Cutting Room in NY 7/23/17 
Whisper Dome at Unitarian Universalist Society in Schenectady, NY 10/21/17  
City Winery in Nashville, TN 11/8/2017 
Ghost Light at Terrapin Crossroads in San Rafael, CA 3/24/18 
Ghost Light at The Acoustic in Bridgeport, CT 4/13/18
Live at Jamcruise 18 01/10/2020

References

External links
 
 https://archive.org/details/HollyBowling
 

Living people
21st-century American composers
21st-century American keyboardists
American women composers
1984 births
American rock pianists
American jazz keyboardists
21st-century American pianists
American women rock singers
American women songwriters
Grateful Dead tribute albums
21st-century American women pianists
21st-century American singers
21st-century women composers